Noah is the second studio album by American rock band The Bob Seger System, released in September 1969 (see 1969 in music). Seger was displeased with the album as it was the label's intention to showcase Tom Neme as the voice of the band.  Seger contemplated quitting music altogether after this album. It has never been reissued on a legitimate U.S. CD by Capitol and probably never will be, as Seger disavows it. It does, however, contain the Seger title song, "Noah", which was issued as a single in July 1969.

The album features the song "Death Row", which was a holdover from the Ramblin' Gamblin' Man sessions. It was originally issued as the B-side of the single "2 + 2 = ?".

Track listing

Personnel
'''The Bob Seger System
 Bob Seger – lead and backing vocals, lead and rhythm guitars
 Tom Neme – lead and rhythm guitars, backing and lead vocals, piano
 Bob Schultz – organ, backing vocals, piano, saxophone
 Dan Honaker – bass, backing and lead vocals
 Pep Perrine – drums, percussion

Production
Engineer: Jim Bruzzese

References

Bob Seger albums
1969 albums
Albums produced by Punch Andrews
Capitol Records albums